The 2009 BFGoodrich Langstreckenmeisterschaft (BFGLM) season was the 32nd season of the VLN.

Calendar

Race Results
Results indicate overall winners only.

References

External links 
 
 

2009 in German motorsport
Nürburgring Endurance Series seasons